Kode is a Swedish locality.

Kode or KODE may also refer to:

 KODE-TV, the ABC affiliate for Joplin, Missouri/Pittsburg, Kansas
 Kodè, an arrondissement in the Ouémé department of Benin
 Kode, the ancient Egyptian name for Kizzuwatna, an Anatolian kingdom
 P. D. Kode (born 1953), Indian judge

See also
 Code (disambiguation)
 Kodes (disambiguation)